Srimantha Wijeratne (born 3 June 1989) is a Sri Lankan-born Canadian cricketer. He made his List A cricket debut in the 2015 ICC World Cricket League Division Two tournament for Canada against the Netherlands on 17 January 2015. In January 2018, he was named in Canada's squad for the 2018 ICC World Cricket League Division Two tournament.

On 3 June 2018, he was selected to play for the Vancouver Knights in the players' draft for the inaugural edition of the Global T20 Canada tournament. In September 2018, he was named in Canada's squad for the 2018–19 ICC World Twenty20 Americas Qualifier tournament. In October 2018, he was named in Canada's squad for the 2018–19 Regional Super50 tournament in the West Indies. In April 2019, he was named in Canada's squad for the 2019 ICC World Cricket League Division Two tournament in Namibia. In September 2019, he was named in Canada's squad for the 2019 Malaysia Cricket World Cup Challenge League A tournament.

In October 2019, he was named in Canada's squad for the 2019 ICC T20 World Cup Qualifier tournament in the United Arab Emirates. He made his Twenty20 International (T20I) debut for Canada, against Oman, on 25 October 2019.

In December 2021, Wijeratne announced his retirement from international cricket.

References

External links
 

1989 births
Living people
Canadian cricketers
Canada Twenty20 International cricketers
Cricketers from Colombo
Canadian people of Sri Lankan descent
ICC Americas cricketers
Sri Lanka Police Sports Club cricketers